On-Orbit Servicing, Assembly, and Manufacturing 2 (OSAM-2), formally known as Archinaut,  is a technology project developing the necessary additive manufacturing technology to build large-scale structures in space. The two-year project started in 2016 and was funded by a NASA contract worth US$20 million; it is being performed by a partnership of Made In Space (MIS), Northrop Grumman, and Oceaneering Space Systems. Its formal name is "Versatile In-Space Robotic Precision Manufacturing and Assembly System".

The initial result will be a 3D printer capable of operating in-orbit, installed on a pod attached outside the International Space Station. Archinaut will include a robotic arm and will be able to fabricate, assemble and repair structures and machinery. Made In Space is building Archinaut's 3D printer, Oceaneering Space Systems its manipulator arm, and Northrop Grumman is in charge of control electronics, software, and integration with the space station.

The first structures to be built with Archinaut are antenna reflectors for communication satellites. Further expansion may involve three robotic arms enabling Archinaut to grab decommissioned satellites and recycle their components.

In June 2017, MIS conducted a month-long successful thermal vacuum chamber test at NASA Ames Research Center's Engineering Evaluation Laboratory (EEL) on its Extended Structure Additive Manufacturing Machine (ESAMM) technology. During the test, MIS manufactured the first-ever extended 3D-printed objects in a space-like environment, a significant milestone on the path to manufacturing systems and satellites in space. The company quickly built on the success and, in July and August 2017, used ESAMM hardware to manufacture a beam structure measuring over 37 meters in length, setting a Guinness Book of World Record for the largest 3D-printed structure.

In July 2019, MIS was awarded a NASA contract for robotic manufacturing and an assembly flight demo mission called Archinaut One. Archinaut One, which will be launched on a Falcon 9 rocket in 2024, will include two ten meter solar arrays which will be placed on an ESPA satellite.

References 

International Space Station
Space manufacturing
3D printing